7-a-side Football at the 2004 Summer Paralympics took place at the Olympic Hockey Centre in Athens. The sport was open to contestants with cerebral palsy. Matches were 30 minutes each way.

The tournament was won by the team representing .

Results

Preliminaries

Group B

Competition bracket

Classification 5-8

Classification 5/6

Classification 7/8

Team Lists

References

 
2004 Summer Paralympics events
2004